was a district located in northeastern Miyagi Prefecture, Japan. It was dissolved in 2005 when forming the city of Tome.

As of 2000, the district estimated population of 89,389 and a density is 191 persons per km2. The total area was 467.98 km2.

Former towns and villages 
The towns and villages formerly in the district, before amalgamation of Tome, including part of Motoyoshi District.

 Hasama
 Ishikoshi
 Minamikata
 Nakada
 Toyoma
 Towa
 Toyosato

Mergers 
On April 1, 2005 - the towns of Hasama, Ishikoshi, Minamikata, Nakada, Toyoma, Towa, Toyosato and Yoneyama merged with the town of Tsuyama (from Motoyoshi District), were merged to create the city of Tome. Tome District was dissolved. The new city hall is located the former town of Hasama.

References

External links 

Former districts of Miyagi Prefecture